Stephen ("Steve") Oldham (born 26 July 1948, High Green, Sheffield, Yorkshire, England) is an English former first-class cricketer, who played for Yorkshire County Cricket Club from 1974 to 1979 and from 1984 to 1985, and for Derbyshire in the intervening years 1980 to 1983.

Oldham made his debut for Yorkshire in the 1974 County Championship, taking 3 wickets for 7 runs in an innings victory for the team. He appeared exclusively in the Second XI during 1975, and rejuvenated his first-team career the following year. Oldham stayed with the Yorkshire first-team until 1979, and moved the following season to Derbyshire.

In the 1981 season, Oldham was a member of the Derbyshire team that won the National Westminster Bank Trophy. In 1982, he achieved his best bowling performance of 7 for 78 against Warwickshire.

In 1984, Oldham moved back to Yorkshire, where, after a season of more consistent batting and fielding from other squad members, he was to find himself out of the first team. He played two more first-class matches during his career, and rounded off his game with Benson & Hedges Cup action in 1989.

In 1993, the then 45-year-old Oldham played in two games for Yorkshire's Second XI, before ending his involvement with the game.

Oldham was a right-arm medium-fast bowler and took 273 first-class wickets at an average of 32.67, and a best performance of 7 for 78. He also took 240 wickets in one day competitions, with a best performance of 5 for 32. He was a right-handed batsman, and played 98 innings in 129 first-class matches at an average of 11.26, and with a top score of 50. He played 63 innings in 177 one day matches.

References

1948 births
English cricketers
Derbyshire cricketers
Yorkshire cricketers
Living people